Mr. Bow-tie is an album by bassist Ron Carter recorded in 1995 and originally released on the Japanese Somethin' Else label with a US release on Blue Note Records.

Reception

The AllMusic review by Scott Yanow observed "All of the music is straightahead and the playing is consistently colorful. This is an impressive effort that is easily recommended".

Track listing 
All compositions by Ron Carter except where noted
 "Mr. Bow-Tie" – 7:07
 "Well, You Needn't" (Thelonious Monk) – 6:43
 "Fill in the Blanks" – 7:06
 "I Thought About You" (Jimmy Van Heusen, Johnny Mercer) – 7:32
 "Nearly" – 8:55
 "Cut and Paste" – 4:45
 "Stablemates" (Benny Golson) – 6:54
 "Wait for the Beep" – 3:52
 "M.S.R.P." – 6:29
 "St. Thomas" (Sonny Rollins) – 5:27

Personnel 
Musicians
Ron Carter - bass 
Edwin Russel – trumpet (tracks 2-10) 
Javon Jackson – tenor saxophone (track 2-10) 
Gonzalo Rubalcaba – piano (tracks 1, 2, 4, 5, 7, 10)
Lewis Nash – drums
Steve Kroon – percussion (tracks 1, 2, 4 & 6-10)

Production
Ron Carter – producer
 – executive producer
James Anderson - engineer (recording, Mixing)
Yoshio Okazaki – engineer (mastering)

References 

Ron Carter albums
1995 albums
Blue Note Records albums